Prosopochaeta anomala is a species of fly in the family Tachinidae described by John Merton Aldrich in 1934.

Distribution
Argentina, Chile.

References 

Diptera of South America
Dexiinae
Taxa named by John Merton Aldrich
Insects described in 1934